is a Japanese manga artist.  His most notable work, Dance in the Vampire Bund, was licensed in English by Seven Seas Entertainment and adapted into a 12-episode anime series by the studio Shaft.

Works

Mainstream

Doujinshi
Ne-To-Ge (2007, Shōnen Gahōsha)
Scandal Shiyō yo (2006, Wani Magazine), sequel of Kokuminteki Kanojo
Narikiri Lovers (2006, Takeshobo)
Coneco!! (2005, Takeshobo), same universe as Anego!
Kyō wa Nani Shiyō (2005, Futabasha)
Jōō-sama tte Yobanaide! (2004, Ohzora Shuppan), story: Marrie Nekosensha
Anego! (2004–2005, serialized in Vitamin, Takeshobo)
Hataraku Megami-sama (2004, Wani Magazine)
Nanairo Karen (2003, Futabasha)
Kokuminteki Kanojo (2003, Wani Magazine)
Maid de Ikimasshoi! (2003, serialized in Vitamin, Takeshobo)
Freaks Dorm (2002, Futabasha)
Iki o Hisomete Idakuite (2001, Angel Shuppan)
Dare ka no Onna (2001, Takeshobo)
Ura Ura Jungle Heat (2000, Angel Shuppan)
Kawaii Hito (2000, Angel Shuppan), (2004 reprint, Futabasha)
Oshigoto Shinakya ne - Let's Love Work (2000, Takeshobo)
Kimi ga Karada de Uso o Tsuku (2000, Angel Shuppan), (2004 reprint, Futabasha)
Ii Koto Shinai ka Koneko-chan (1999, Daitosha), (2002 reprint, Daitosha)
Hito ni Ienai Aidakara (1998, Angel Shuppan), (2003 reprint, Futabasha)
Femme Kabuki (姫カブキ恋道中 Hime Kabuki Rendōchū; 1998–1999, serialized in Men’s Action, Futabasha)
Gomen ne Acchie: Koko ni KISS shite (1999, Angel Shuppan), (2002 reprint, Souryuusha)
Gomen ne Acchie (1998, Angel Shuppan), (2002 reprint, Souryuusha)

Notes

References

External links 

Official website 
Personal Blog  

1966 births
Living people
People from Setagaya
Manga artists from Tokyo
Hentai manga artists